The Estadio Gran Mamoré is a multi-use stadium in Trinidad, Bolivia.  It is currently used mostly for football matches and is the home stadium of Libertad Gran Mamoré and Universitario del Beni. The stadium holds 12,000 people.

References

External links
Stadium information

Gran Mamore
Trinidad, Bolivia
Buildings and structures in Beni Department